Maku free zone International Airport , also known as  Maku Airport, is an airport serving the cities of Maku and Showt, both located in the West Azerbaijan Province of Iran.

Airlines and destinations

References

External links

Airports in Iran
Buildings and structures in West Azerbaijan Province
Transportation in West Azerbaijan Province